Gordon Vance (born December 17, 1951) is a Republican member of the Montana Legislature.  He was elected to House District 67 in 2008 which represents a portion of the Gallatin County area. He still represents the same area, but instead as a State Senator of District 34.

References

Living people
1951 births
Republican Party members of the Montana House of Representatives
Montana State University alumni
21st-century American politicians